Robert Tourly (1888–1966) was a journalist, director of the French Communist Party, and later a pacifist. He is known for his 1932 book on Adolf Hitler.

Life

Robert Tourly was born in 1888 in Saint-Leu-d'Esserent, Oise.
He joined the French Section of the Workers' International (SFIO) in 1911.
In 1912, he contributed to the Prolétaire de l'Oise founded that year, and in 1913, he became editor in chief of Démocratie de l'Aisne.
He served in the army during World War I (1914–18).
In 1922, Tourly was elected to the managing committee of the French Communist Party (PCF: Parti communiste de France).
He was expelled from the PCF the next year.

A reviewer said of his 1928 collection of journalistic sketches Le Conflit de demain : Berlin, Varsovie, Dantzig that it was "somewhat superficial, but lively and sincere."
In the 1930s, Tourly was fully dedicated to pacifism, as were Madeleine Vernet and Théodore Ruyssen.
He was among the members of the Ligue internationale des combattants de la paix (LICP) founded by Victor Méric (1876–1933) in 1931.
He was known for directing La Patrie humaine (1931–39) with Victor Méric and Roger Monclin (1903–85).
Tourly and Z. Lvovsky co-authored a short biography of Hitler in 1932, describing his nationalistic and anti-semitic agenda and analyzing his base of support. The authors called for discussion on reasonable changes to the Treaty of Versailles and for European economic union and disarmament.

Robert Tourly died in 1966.

Publications

References

Sources

1888 births
1966 deaths
French communists